Cameron Hayley (born July 21, 1996) is a Canadian professional stock car racing driver. He currently competes part-time in the SPEARS Southwest Tour Series, driving the No. 7 Ford Fusion for Jefferson Pitts Racing. Hayley won the K&N Pro Series race at the inaugural UNOH Battle at the Beach at Daytona International Speedway in 2013.

Early and personal life
Hayley grew up in Calgary, Alberta. At age 4, he began running practice laps in go-karts. Hayley began racing competitively in karts in 2004 at age seven, finishing 3rd in his first event. He would go on to win both the Rookie of the Year award and championship in Calgary's Junior 1 Championships. Hayley won both the Calgary and Edmonton Jr. Championships the next year. Hayley won his third straight Calgary championship in 2006, winning every karting event he entered. From 2007 to 2010, he competed in Mini-Max karts, several divisions of the Miniature Motorsports Racing Association (MMRA), Legends cars, and Super Late Models. Hayley would compete in events in the American states of North Dakota, Nevada, Washington, and Montana.

Hayley's family owns Hayley Industrial Electronics Ltd. (founded in 1978) as well as longtime sponsor Cabinets by Hayley, a Canadian company which produces steel cabinets. According to Haley, the latter business was started by his father to fund his racing career.

Racing career
In 2011, at the age of 15, Hayley began racing in the regional K&N Pro Series West for longtime owner Bill McAnally. Hayley became the youngest driver ever to run a NASCAR sanctioned race. Hayley ran four races that season, and the full 2012 season for McAnally, scoring seven top fives and 11 top tens in total. Hayley was also named to the NASCAR Next 9, along with future national series drivers Ryan Blaney, Chase Elliott, Dylan Kwasniewski, Corey LaJoie, Kyle Larson, and Daniel Suárez. For 2013, Hayley moved to Glen Price Motorsports. Hayley won the exhibition UNOH Battle at the Beach (the successor to the Toyota All-Star Showdown) at Daytona to open the season. Hayley scored his first points-paying West Series victory at All American Speedway. The win, along with 6 poles and 12 top five finishes led Hayley to a second-place finish in points. Hayley also made his debut in the K&N Pro Series East at Richmond, and ran two races in the NASCAR Canadian Tire Series for D. J. Kennington.

For 2014, Hayley moved to the K&N Pro Series East full-time with Turner Scott Motorsports, driving the No. 98 Chevrolet Impala that had won the championship the year before with Dylan Kwasniewski. Hayley earned a pole and seven top fives to finish second in points behind teammate Ben Rhodes.

Also in 2014, Hayley made the drive to Evergreen Speedway in Monroe, WA for the 2014 Summer Showdown with his Cabinets By Hayley Super Late Model team. He started on the pole and led every lap to claim the $25,000 winners purse.

Camping World Truck Series
Hayley would also make his national series debut in the Camping World Truck Series in TSM's No. 32 Chevrolet Silverado at Canadian Tire Motorsports Park in Ontario. Hayley ran three races for TSM in the Truck Series, with a sixth-place finish at Loudon.

For 2015, Hayley was signed by ThorSport Racing to drive their No. 13 Toyota Tundra, replacing Jeb Burton. He had a solid season by finishing 6th in points, runner up to Erik Jones for the rookie of the year title. Hayley returned to ThorSport Racing in 2016, where he finished 11th in points with 11 top-ten finishes. He left the team after the season ended.

Motorsports career results

NASCAR
(key) (Bold – Pole position awarded by qualifying time. Italics – Pole position earned by points standings or practice time. * – Most laps led.)

Camping World Truck Series

K&N Pro Series East

K&N Pro Series West

Canadian Tire Series

 Season still in progress
 Ineligible for series points

References

External links
 

Living people
1996 births
NASCAR drivers
Racing drivers from Alberta
Sportspeople from Calgary
Canadian racing drivers